The Eponym Group (Hamnam) was an electoral list for the 1980 Iranian legislative election claiming "it would choose its candidates based on merit without regard to party affiliation". Close to the Freedom Movement, the group formed a minority in the parliament with approximately 15 to 23 seats. Due to internal conflicts, the Freedom Movement did not issue a list but its members were included in the Eponym list. The list had members of Freedom Movement, JAMA and Islamic Republican Party.

Election results

References 

1980 establishments in Iran
Electoral lists for Iranian legislative election, 1980
Freedom Movement of Iran